The Winding Gulf Coalfield is located in western Raleigh County and eastern Wyoming County, in southern West Virginia. It is named after the Winding Gulf stream, a tributary of the Guyandotte River. In the early 20th century, it was promoted as the "Billion Dollar Coalfield".

History 
The nomadic Native Americans who hunted there for thousands of years ending in the Woodland Period and the early European settlers in the Virginia Colony and the Commonwealth of Virginia were generally aware of the "rock that burns" which lay below the rugged terrain of the mountainous area which became southern West Virginia. However, aside from some personal mines, no commercial value had been realized by the mid 19th century.

Noted British geologist David T. Ansted (1814-1880) was among the early experts hired by potential investors to survey promising coal fields along the New River in southern Virginia in the United States. In 1853, Dr. Ansted helped identify the rich bituminous coal seams which lay there. His work set the stage for a mining boom in the area, where he invested in land in what became the new state of West Virginia in 1863 during the American Civil War (1861-1865).

It took transportation and industrialized techniques to realize the commercial potential. A protégé of Dr. Ansted, William N. Page (1854-1932), became a leading industrialist and developer of iron furnaces, coal mines and railroads in the area, leading and managing such enterprises as the Gauley Mountain Coal Company for absentee investors, many of whom were based overseas in the United Kingdom. Page came to West Virginia to help complete the Chesapeake & Ohio Railway (C&O) between Richmond, Virginia and the Ohio River in the early 1870s, and helped develop branch lines to coal mining facilities. Former West Virginia Governor William A. MacCorkle described him as a man who knew the land "as a farmer knows a field." Beginning in 1898, Page began working on a scheme to expand into the Winding Gulf area, which was also in the sights of the C&O, whose main line ran along the New and Kanawha River Valleys.

The C&O was heavily working the New River Coalfield, and planning expansion into the Winding Gulf region. However, despite efforts to discourage him, Page  introduced unwanted competition by what appeared at the time to be mysterious means. In what has become a popular tale of both U.S. railroads and business competition, the story was recorded and told by historian and rail author H. Reid in The Virginian Railway, published in 1961.

It turned out that William Page, who the C&O knew to be a bright man but of apparently limited financial means, had the secret backing of millionaire industrialist Henry Huttleston Rogers (1840-1909). It became a major third coal exporter at Hampton Roads in 1909. Despite the inefficiency of some duplicative  facilities, the Winding Gulf Coalfield benefited from the two major railroad outlets, and became one of the most productive in the state.

The mining of coal in the Winding Gulf Coalfield began in the first decade of the 20th century and continues into the 21st century. The coal in this field is a low volatile coal, and the seams of coal that have been mined include Beckley, Pocahontas No. 3, Pocahontas No. 4, and Sewell.

Coal camps 
Over 50 coal camps (also known as coal towns) were once located there, with independent commercial districts at Sophia and Mullens anchoring the eastern and western ends of the field. By the 21st century many coal camps had partially or completely returned to nature.

Some of the names associated with the Winding Gulf Coalfields are:

 Abney 
 Affinity 
 Ameagle 
 Amigo 
 Arnett 
 Artie
 Battleship 
 Beechwood 
 Besoco
 Big Stick
 Black Eagle
 Blue Jay 
 Blue Jay 6
 Bolt
 Bud
 Caloric (later named Otsego) 
 Cedar
 Coal City
 Cool Ridge
 Corinne 
 Covel 
 Crab Orchard
 Devils Fork‡ 

 Eastgulf
 Eccles
 Edwight
 Fireco 
 Fitzpatrick
 Garwood
 Glen Rogers 
 Glen White 
 Helen
 Herndon 
 Hollywood
 Hot Coal
 Hotchkiss
 Iroquois
 Itmann
 Jonben 
 Josephine 
 Killarney 
 Lego 
 Lester 
 Lillybrook
 Lynwinn

 Maben
 MacArthur
 Madeline 
 McAlpin
 McVey
 Mead
 Metalton
 Micajah
 Midway 
 Montcoal 
 Montecarlo
 Mullens
 Odd
 Otsego 
 Pemberton
 Pickshin
 Pinepoca
 Ravencliff
 Rhodell
 Sabine
 Skelton 
 Slab Fork

 Sophia
 Stickney
 Stephenson 
 Stonecoal Junction
 Stotesbury
 Sullivan 
 Surveyor 
 Tams 
 Tralee 
 Ury
 VanNess (later named Mead)
 Viacova
 Whitby
 Willibet 
 Winding Gulf
 Woodbay 
 Woodpeck
 Wyco

Railroads 
The company towns were located along Winding Gulf Creek, Stone Coal Creek, upper Piney Creek, Slab Fork, Laurel Fork, Devils Fork, Barkers Creek, and the Guyandotte River. The main railroad in this coalfield, the Virginian Railway (VGN), had branches running along all of these streams.

The Virginian's main line bisected the field as well, in addition to a repair shop and rail yard at Mullens (named the Elmore Yard), which was operated by the Norfolk and Western Railway (N&W) after a 1959 merger. The Chesapeake & Ohio Railway (C&O) also served the eastern part coalfield, but never entered the Wyoming County portion.

Companies, ethnics 
Winding Gulf Collaries, Gulf Smokeless Coal Co., C.H. Mead Coal Co., E.E. White Coal Co., and Pemberton Coal and Coke Co. were among the early players in the field. These companies recruited native born whites for employment, but also imported Poles, Italians, and other European immigrants to work in their coal mines. African-Americans were hired to work in the coal mines of the Winding Gulf Coalfield as well.  By the time the "coal boom" of the late 1970s and early 1980s occurred, Westmoreland Coal Co. and Eastern Associated Coal Co. were the dominant operators and most of the ethnic diversity had disappeared (including polka dances at St. Francis De Sales Catholic Church in Beckley).

21st century 
While millions of tons of coal have been mined from this coalfield, the mineral is still extracted at a few deep and strip mines, and a large International Coal Group deep mine and preparation plant on the edge of Beckley, WV started operations in late 2007.

See also
 Coalfield
 West Virginia
 William N. Page
New River Coalfield
Pocahontas Coalfield

References

External links 
Coalfields of the Appalachian Mountains - Winding Gulf Field
Winding Gulf Coal Towns Group history of the residents and towns in this region
 "Coming and Going." Popular Science, June 1960, p. 95, bottom of page, photo shows the radical railroad hairpin that allows shipment.

 
Coal mining in Appalachia
Coal mining regions in the United States
Mining in West Virginia
Geography of Raleigh County, West Virginia
Geography of Wyoming County, West Virginia
National Coal Heritage Area